Jinyu Hutong station is a station on Line 8 of the Beijing Subway.

History 
Construction started in November 2016. The station was originally called Wangfujing North station. The station opened on December 31, 2021.

Station Layout 
This station has an island platform. There are 4 exits, all connected to malls. Only the southeast exit is connected to the street.

References 

Beijing Subway stations in Dongcheng District